White Knight Broadcasting is a company based in Lafayette, Louisiana owning three stations, based in Louisiana and Texas. It was founded in 1995 when it purchased then-religious independent station KWLB (now KSHV-TV) in Shreveport, LA.

On April 24, 2013, as part of the sale of White Knight Broadcasting's partner Communications Corporation of America to the Nexstar Broadcasting Group, White Knight announced the sale of its entire group to Mission Broadcasting (except for KSHV-TV, which would be sold to a company called Rocky Creek Communications), with Nexstar taking over the operations of the stations through shared services agreements. The deal was later withdrawn, and White Knight retained ownership of the stations although Nexstar had inherited the SSAs.

Background 
Malara Enterprises was the parent company of White Knight Broadcasting.
White Knight owns or operates three stations:
KFXK-TV and KFXL-LP, Tyler-Longview-Lufkin, Texas
WVLA-TV, Baton Rouge, Louisiana

It also previously owned KKWB (now KTFN) in El Paso, Texas and KZUP-CD in Baton Rouge, Louisiana. KKWB, a WB affiliate at the time, was sold in 2002 to Entravision Communications, which converted the station to TeleFutura. KZUP, an independent low-power television station, was sold to Nexstar in 2016.

See also
Duopoly (broadcasting)
Cunningham Broadcasting and Deerfield Mediasimilar holding companies related to Sinclair Broadcast Group
Mission Broadcasting

References 
 Business Profile
 CCA, White Knight file for Chapter 11/
 Owners of KMSS and KSHV to sell
 Comcorp ready for next chapter
 JW Broadcasting buys WUFX, Jackson,MS
http://www.tvnewsday.com/articles/2006/03/15/daily.5

Companies based in Louisiana
Television broadcasting companies of the United States
Nexstar Media Group